The West Tampa Historic District is a U.S. historic district situated in the larger neighborhood of West Tampa in the city of Tampa, Florida. On October 18, 1983, it was added to the National Register of Historic Places.

References

External links
 Map of West Tampa Historic District

West Tampa
Historic districts on the National Register of Historic Places in Florida